Motherhood By Choice, Not Chance is a 2004 documentary film directed by filmmaker, Dorothy Fadiman, which takes key moments from each of the three films from Fadiman's trilogy called,  CHOICE: From the Back-Alleys to the Supreme Court & Beyond, by weaving together selected scenes and interviews.   The film comes in two versions, the Activist and Educational.  A Spanish Activist version was also created called, Maternidad por Elección, No por Obligación, with an introduction by Dolores Huerta. 
 
Of making the film, Dorothy Fadiman said, "After six years in production, I realized that the 2.5 hour series was too long to show in most setting, such as meetings or classrooms. Working with a core member of my production team, Katie Peterson, we put together Motherhood by Choice, a film based on the most powerful and provocative moments from each of the three films.  The result was a half-hour DVD which could easily be shown at conferences, in academic settings and as a highlight of any gathering. While each of the individual films are still shown, many groups find the 30 minute constellation of clips a perfect length."

External links 
 
 Watch Motherhood By Choice, Not Chance for free on vimeo.com
 Watch or download Motherhood By Choice, Not Chance for free  at archive.org

2004 films
Films directed by Dorothy Fadiman
Documentary films about abortion
Abortion in the United States
2000s English-language films
American short documentary films
American documentary films about politics
2000s American films
2004 short documentary films